Christopher Handke (born 14 February 1989) is a German professional footballer who plays for Ummendorfer SV.

Career
Born in Bad Frankenhausen, Handke made his professional debut for Rot-Weiß Erfurt during the 2008–09 3. Liga season against Paderborn 07.

On 4 May 2016, Handke extended his contract with 1. FC Magdeburg until 2017.

Career statistics

References

External links
 
 

1989 births
Living people
People from Bad Frankenhausen
Footballers from Thuringia
German footballers
Association football defenders
3. Liga players
FC Rot-Weiß Erfurt players
VfB Germania Halberstadt players
1. FC Magdeburg players
FSV Zwickau players
2. Bundesliga players